Blue Valentine  is a 2010 American romantic drama film written and directed by Derek Cianfrance. Cianfrance, Cami Delavigne, and Joey Curtis wrote the film, and the band Grizzly Bear scored it. Blue Valentine depicts a married couple, played by Michelle Williams and Ryan Gosling, shifting back and forth in time between their courtship and the dissolution of their marriage several years later.

The film received critical acclaim and Williams was nominated for both the Academy Award for Best Actress and the Golden Globe Award for Best Actress in a Motion Picture – Drama, while Gosling received a nomination for the Golden Globe Award for Best Actor – Motion Picture Drama.

Plot

Dean is a hopeless-romantic high-school dropout, working for a moving company in Brooklyn. Cindy is an aspiring doctor studying pre-med while living with her bickering parents and caring for her grandmother in Pennsylvania. She is dating a fellow student named Bobby and one day, the two have intercourse where he ejaculates inside her without her consent. This causes an angered Cindy to break up with him. Sometime later, while Dean is delivering furniture to a nursing home in Pennsylvania, he runs into Cindy, who is visiting her grandmother. He gives her his number but she never calls; however, they coincidentally meet again on a bus and begin dating shortly afterwards. 

After discovering their relationship, a jealous Bobby violently assaults Dean. Cindy finds out she is pregnant and tells Dean he is unlikely to be the father. She opts for an abortion but changes her mind during the procedure. Dean then comforts and reassures her that they can raise the child together. Cindy and Dean soon get married.

Five years later, the couple lives in rural Pennsylvania with their daughter, Frankie, and family dog, Megan. Cindy is now a nurse at a clinic where her boss, Dr. Feinberg, had just offered her to join him at his new clinic in the near future. Meanwhile, Dean, unambitious and struggling with alcohol, paints houses for a living. After having gone missing due to Cindy leaving a gate unlocked, Megan is found dead by the roadside which further strains the couple's marriage. Despite Cindy's reluctance, Dean insists on a romantic getaway at a motel to relax and rekindle their relationship. Stopping by a liquor store, Cindy has an awkward encounter with Bobby, which causes an ensuing argument in the car between her and Dean.

At the motel, Dean repeatedly tries to seduce Cindy but she rebuffs him. Frustrated with Dean's lack of ambition, she questions him during dinner which leads to another argument. The two make up and get drunk, but Cindy is displeased when Dean asks if she wants to have another child with him. They start fighting again and she locks him outside the bedroom. Early in the morning, Cindy is unexpectedly called in for work. She takes the car and leaves a note for Dean. At the clinic, Dr. Feinberg recommends that Cindy move into an apartment near the new clinic instead of moving her family, suggesting that they could keep each other company if she is lonely which visibly upsets Cindy.

Back at the motel, an annoyed Dean finds the note and shows up drunk at the clinic where he has another heated argument with Cindy. Dean punches Dr. Feinberg when he tries to intervene who then fires Cindy and kicks them both out. While leaving, Cindy demands a divorce making Dean throw away his wedding ring but they both attempt to look for it later. Back at her parents' house, Dean tries to persuade Cindy to give the marriage another chance for Frankie. Cindy says she doesn't want Frankie to grow up with parents who despise each other like she did. After Dean reminds Cindy of their vows, they both apologize and hug, but she pulls away. Dean leaves the house while Frankie runs after him and begs him to stay. He tricks her to return to Cindy and then continues walking away. The film ends with photos of Dean and Cindy in the early stages of their romance.

Cast
 Ryan Gosling as Dean Pereira
 Michelle Williams as Cynthia “Cindy” Heller
 Faith Wladyka as Frances "Frankie" Pereira
 John Doman as Jerry Heller
 Mike Vogel as Bobby Ontario
 Marshall Johnson as Marshall
 Jen Jones as Gramma
 Ben Shenkman as Dr. Feinberg
 Maryann Plunkett as Glenda

Production
Williams was 21 when she received the script in 2002 and Gosling committed to the production four years later, but filming did not begin until 2009, when Williams was 28 (as was Gosling), owing to Cianfrance's inability to find financing. The director was also unable to film the "young" and "older" scenes several years apart as he had hoped, again due to lack of money. The film was to be shot in California but production was moved to Brooklyn, New York and Honesdale, Pennsylvania. Since her partner Heath Ledger had died the year prior, Williams wanted to stay close to her Brooklyn home to take care of their daughter, Matilda. Accordingly, the director chose Honesdale due to its proximity to Brooklyn. Filming began on 12 May 2009.

Gosling and Williams improvised dialogue; the scene in which their characters wander through New York together was unscripted, for example; the actors—who had both appeared in The United States of Leland (2003) but had not shared scenes—got to know each other during its filming. Before filming the marriage dissolution between the main characters, Gosling and Williams prepared by renting a home, bringing their own clothing and belongings, buying groceries with a budget based on their characters' incomes, filming home movies and taking a family portrait at a local Sears with the actress who played their daughter, and staging out arguments. Cianfrance visited the actors and assisted them in building tension while remaining in character: "One night he told Gosling to go into Williams' bedroom and try to make love to her. Gosling, soundly rejected, ended up sleeping on the couch."

The film was shot in Super 16mm and Red One. The former was used for the pre-marriage scenes and the latter was used for the post-marriage scenes.
Andrij Parekh used only one professional light in the filming of the outside scenes, otherwise using only practical lights for the inside scenes.

While on The Hollywood Reporter Director's Roundtable, Cianfrance said that he had given up his entire director's fee to help fund the film: "I mean, it came down to we were exactly my fee short. They paid me and I just paid it back. So I still have to pay taxes on it, you know. So I actually had to pay to make the movie."

Music
Gosling wrote and performed some songs by himself. The band Grizzly Bear composed the score of the film. A soundtrack for the film was released by Lakeshore Records.

One of the film's feature songs, "You and Me", which is presented as the couple's personal song, was originally recorded as a demo by a group called Penny & The Quarters for the obscure Prix Label of Columbus, Ohio in the early 1970s. It was re-released on a compilation album by the Numero Group in 2007 without the members of the group being identified.

Release
The film premiered in competition at the 26th Sundance Film Festival. The film was screened in the Un Certain Regard section at the 2010 Cannes Film Festival and premiered at the Toronto International Film Festival on September 15, 2010. In Australia, the film was released on December 26, 2010 through Palace Films. In the United States, it was distributed by The Weinstein Company as a limited release on December 29, 2010.

Rating
On October 8, 2010, Blue Valentine was given an NC-17 rating by the MPAA for American cinemas. This was due to a scene depicting cunnilingus. Gosling accused the MPAA of sexism and misogyny. "There's plenty of oral sex scenes in a lot of movies, where it's a man receiving it from a woman – and they're R-rated. Ours is reversed and somehow it's perceived as pornographic", he stated. The Weinstein Company appealed the decision and aimed for an R without any trims to the film, believing the prior decision would significantly harm the film's potential box office take in the United States. The appeal was successful on December 8, 2010, and the film received an R rating.

The film was given an uncut 15 certificate from the British Board of Film Classification.

Home media
The film was released on DVD and Blu-ray on May 10, 2011. Special features include an audio commentary with director Derek Cianfrance, a making-of documentary, deleted scenes, and home movies. The film has grossed $5,336,207 through US video sales.

Reception

Critical response
Blue Valentine received critical acclaim. Rotten Tomatoes, a review aggregator, reports that 86% of 212 surveyed critics gave the film a positive review; the average rating is 7.80/10. The website's critical consensus states: "This emotionally gripping examination of a marriage on the rocks isn't always easy to watch, but Michelle Williams and Ryan Gosling give performances of unusual depth and power." On Metacritic, the film has an average score of 81 out of 100 based on 42 reviews, meaning "universal acclaim".

Roger Ebert of the Chicago Sun-Times gave the film three and a half out of four stars, and wrote: "Dean seems stuck. He seems to stay fixed at the initial stage. Can you see the difference between (1) 'He loves me as much as he always did', and (2) 'He loves me exactly like he always did'? ...

Top ten lists
Blue Valentine was listed on many critics' top ten lists.

 1st – Nathan Rabin, The A.V. Club
 1st – Mick LaSalle, San Francisco Chronicle
 1st – Joe Neumaier, New York Daily News
 2nd – Drew McWeeny, HitFix
 3rd – Claudia Puig, USA Today
 4th – Andrew O'Hehir, Salon.com
 4th – Peter Hartlaub, San Francisco Chronicle
 4th – Steve Persall, St. Petersburg Times
 6th – Chuck Wilson, L.A. Weekly
 6th – Mike Scott, The Times-Picayune
 7th – Owen Gleiberman, Entertainment Weekly
 7th – Clint O'Conner, Cleveland Plain Dealer
 8th – Rene Rodriguez, Miami Herald
 Top 10 (listed alphabetically) – Dana Stevens, Slate
 Top 10 (listed alphabetically) – Joe Williams, St. Louis Post-Dispatch

Accolades
In 2006, the script won the Chrysler Film Project, a competition that awards cash to an outstanding new feature film director overseen by Independent Feature Project.

References

External links
 
 
 
 
 

2010 films
2010s English-language films
2010s erotic drama films
2010 romantic drama films
American romantic drama films
American erotic romance films
Films set in New York City
Films set in Pennsylvania
Films shot in New York City
Films shot in Pennsylvania
American independent films
American erotic drama films
American nonlinear narrative films
Films directed by Derek Cianfrance
Films about abortion
Improvised films
Obscenity controversies in film
Rating controversies in film
2010 independent films
2010s American films
Films scored by musical groups